The 45th Air Assault Brigade was a brigade of the Ukrainian Air Assault Forces, formed twice. The brigade was first formed in 1993 from elements of the 299th Guards Airborne Regiment of the 98th Guards Airborne Division. Part of the 1st Airmobile Division, the brigade was disbanded. The brigade was reformed from an airmobile battalion in 2016. The brigade was disbanded again in 2020.

History

First formation 
The brigade was first formed in 1993 from elements of the 299th Guards Airborne Regiment of the 98th Guards Airborne Division. It became part of the 1st Airmobile Division at Bolhrad. The division was disbanded in 2003. The brigade became the 16th Mechanized Brigade (Military Unit Number 1533) and was then disbanded in 2006.

Second formation 
In 2013, the 88th Separate Airmobile Battalion was formed as part of the 79th Airmobile Brigade. The battalion fought in the War in Donbass. On 19 October 2016, the battalion became the 45th Air Assault Brigade at Bolhrad. The brigade was entirely manned by contract servicemen and was equipped with BTR-3DA armored personnel carriers. Much of the brigade was mixed units formed from other airmobile brigades. The brigade was disbanded in 2020 due to demobilization of most of its staff.

Structure 
As of 2017 the brigade's structure was as follows:

 45th Air Assault Brigade, Bolhrad
 Headquarters & Headquarters Company
 1st Air Assault Battalion (BTR-3DA)
 2nd Air Assault Battalion (BTR-3DA)
 3rd Air Assault Battalion (BTR-3DA)
 Brigade Artillery Group
 Headquarters & Target Acquisition Battery
 Self-propelled Artillery Battalion (2S1 Gvozdika)
 Howitzer Artillery Battalion (2A18 D-30)
 Rocket Artillery Battalion (BM-21 Grad)
 Anti-Aircraft Missile Artillery Battalion
 Tank Company
 Reconnaissance Company
 Engineer Company
 Landing Support Company
 Maintenance Company
 Logistic Company
 Signal Company
 CBRN-defense Company
 Medical Company
 Sniper Platoon

References 

Brigades of the Ukrainian Air Assault Forces
Military units and formations established in 1993
Airborne infantry brigades
2016 establishments in Ukraine